Triton Hopper is a proposed NASA lander to Triton, the largest moon of Neptune. The idea is to harvest the abundant nitrogen ice on the surface of Triton and use it as propellant for multiple short flights and explore a variety of locations. The concept transitioned in March 2018 to Phase II to refine their designs and explore aspects of implementing the new technology.

History
Triton is the largest moon of Neptune. In 1989, Voyager 2 flew past the moon at a distance of 40,000 km, and discovered several cryovolcanoes on its surface. Triton is geologically active; its surface is young and has relatively few impact craters. It has a very thin atmosphere.

The Triton Hopper concept started Phase I in 2015, and it transitioned in March 2018 to Phase II, where the new technologies are being matured by NASA's Institute for Advanced Concepts (NIAC).

Overview
The Triton Hopper concept proposes the use of a radioisotope rocket engine that would collect nitrogen ice on or below the surface, heat it under pressure and use it as propellant to explore Neptune's moon Triton. The largest technological challenge is to learn how to mine local surface nitrogen ice, and how to heat it for use as propellant.  The rocket-powered hops are estimated to be up to 1 km high and 5 km long.

A rocket-powered vehicle, or "hopper", has several advantages due to the variety of terrain and a gravity of only 8% of that of Earth. Hemispheric traverses and atmospheric sampling are possible during hops.

While airborne, the craft could acquire images and videos during flight. While on the ground, it could photograph and analyze the chemistry and geology of the surface. It could potentially fly through geysers on Triton's surface to analyze the material ejected from them.

See also

Comet Hopper
Europa Lander (NASA)
Trident, a flyby proposal to Triton

References

External links
Exploring Neptune's Captured Kuiper Belt Object, a short NASA video at YouTube
 

Proposed NASA space probes
Missions to Neptune
Landers (spacecraft)
Hopping spacecraft